Tari West Airport  is a public use airport located near Tari, Chari-Baguirmi, Chad.

See also
List of airports in Chad

References

External links 
 Airport record for Tari West Airport at Landings.com

Airports in Chad
Chari-Baguirmi Region